Gérard Bessette (25 February 1920, in Sainte-Anne-de-Sabrevois, Quebec – 21 February 2005, in Kingston, Ontario) was a French Canadian writer and educator.

Bessette grew up in Montreal and attended the Collège Saint-Ignace. He continued his studies at the Université de Montréal, where in 1950 he completed his doctorate entitled Images in French-Canadian poetry.

Unable to obtain an academic position in Quebec because of his atheism, he taught at Duquesne University in Pittsburgh from 1951 to 1957. He then found a job in Kingston, Ontario, first at Royal Military College of Canada in 1958, and then in the Department of French Studies at Queen's University from 1959 to 1979. Bessette's novels L'incubation (1965) and Le cycle (1971) won the Governor General's Literary Award for Fiction (French). In 1980 he was awarded the Prix Athanase-David, Quebec's highest literary honour.

Several of Bessette's works address issues that led to and were representative of the Révolution tranquille, a series of societal shifts that took place in Quebec during the 1960s, which saw increased secularization and a general movement away from the influence of the Catholic Church. His earlier works are written in a realistic style, while his later novels utilize elements of the nouveau roman literary movement and tend to be more experimental. His literary criticism is noted for its Freudian readings of Québécois literature.

One of his most noted works is Le libraire (1960), an existential tale of a book store employee in a small Quebec town in the 1950s. The book deals with one of Bessette's most common themes: the stifling culture of Quebec of that time. His work was also part of the literature event in the art competition at the 1948 Summer Olympics.

Bibliography
La bagarre (1958) (translated as The Brawl)
Les Images en poésie canadienne-française (1960)
Le libraire (1960) (translated as Not for Every Eye)
Les pédagogue (1961)
Poèmes temporels (1962)
L'incubation (1965) (translated as Incubation)
Les images en poésie canadienne-française (1967)
Une littérature en ébullition (1968)
De Québec à Saint-Boniface (editor, 1968)
Histoire de la littérature canadienne-française (edited with Lucien Geslin and Charles Parent, 1968)  
Le cycle (1971) (translated as The Cycle)
Trois romanciers québécois (1973)
La commensale (1975)
Les anthropoïdes (1977)
Mes romans et moi (1979)
Le semestre (1979)
La garden-party de Christophine (1980)
Les dires d'Omer Marin (1985)

References

 France, Peter (Ed.) (1995). The New Oxford Companion to Literature in French. Oxford: Clarendon Press.  .
"Gérard Bessette," Microsoft Encarta Online Encyclopedia 2009 (Archived 2009-10-31)

External links
 Remise du prix du Québec

1920 births
2005 deaths
Canadian male novelists
People from Montérégie
Writers from Quebec
French Quebecers
Governor General's Award-winning fiction writers
Prix Athanase-David winners
Academic staff of the Royal Military College of Canada
Canadian novelists in French
20th-century Canadian novelists
20th-century Canadian male writers
Olympic competitors in art competitions
Canadian expatriates in the United States